Scenedesmus acuminatus is a green alga in the family Scenedesmaceae.

Scenedesmus is an example of a colonial green algae.  It is more often found floating in the creek water and not attached to rocks on the bottom.  Unlike most of the colonial green algae that form long filaments, scenedesmus forms small chains of four cells.  The ends of the colony possess cell wall extensions that have a spike like appearance.  Small vacuoles, filled with oil, can be seen at either end of each cell.  The oil enables them to float in the water, maximizing their exposure to sunlight.

References

Sphaeropleales